Joanna Venetia Invicta Stevenson (10 March 1938 – 26 September 2022) was an English actress.

Early life
Born in 1938 in London, England, as Joanna Venetia Invicta Stevenson, she was the daughter of film director Robert Stevenson and actress Anna Lee. The family moved to Hollywood within a year of her birth after her father signed a contract with film producer David O. Selznick. When her parents divorced in 1944, she stayed with her father and new stepmother, Frances. After an education in exclusive Californian private schools, her theatrical debut was with her mother in Liliom, a play produced by the Sombrero Theater, in Phoenix, Arizona, in April 1955 and with the husband-and-wife team of Fernando Lamas and Arlene Dahl.

A one-time Miss Los Angeles Press Club, Stevenson was placed on contract by RKO Pictures in November 1956. Hedda Hopper named Stevenson on her list of top movie newcomers in January 1957, alongside Jayne Mansfield. Hopper said of Stevenson, then 18, she is "the most purely beautiful of all the new crop of stars."

Film and television actress
On 13 March 1957, Stevenson was cast in CBS's Playhouse 90 adaptation of Charley's Aunt, with Tom Tryon, Jackie Coogan, and Jeanette MacDonald. On 12 November 1957, Stevenson appeared as Kathy Larsen in the episode "Trail's End" of the ABC/Warner Bros. Western series, Sugarfoot.

Stevenson played Peggy McTavish in the film Darby's Rangers (1958), a Warner Bros. release in which she was paired with Peter Brown. She is one of the women pursued by actors cast as members of an American unit of the same name during World War II. The movie was directed by William Wellman.

Stevenson's publicity machine continued to promote her. She was reported enjoying riding horses as an activity and playing table tennis. In November 1957, she won $300 in prizes at a horse show and participated at the National Horse Show at the Cow Palace in San Francisco. Around this time, she became the face on Sweetheart Stout cans and bottles; the brand marked the 50th anniversary of using her image in 2008.

She appeared in the Western drama Day of the Outlaw (1959), starring Robert Ryan and Tina Louise. Stevenson also had a primary role in the film version of the Studs Lonigan trilogy by James T. Farrell, brought to the screen in December 1960.

Among the other motion pictures in which she appears are Island of Lost Women (1959), Jet Over the Atlantic (1959), The Big Night (1960), Seven Ways from Sundown (1960), The City of the Dead (or Horror Hotel, 1960), and The Sergeant Was a Lady (1961).

Stevenson appeared on television in episodes of Cheyenne (1957), Colt .45 (1958), 77 Sunset Strip (1958), The Adventures of Ozzie and Harriet (1958), Lawman (1958), The Millionaire (1959), The Third Man (1959), and Alfred Hitchcock Presents (1960) alongside Burt Reynolds and Harry Dean Stanton.

She appeared in Back to the Future Part II (1989) as the cover girl of the Oh Lala magazine.

Sweetheart Stout

The same photo of Stevenson has appeared on cans and bottles of Sweetheart Stout beer since 1958.

Personal life

Marriages and relationships

Stevenson married MGM actor-dancer Russ Tamblyn on Valentine's Day, 1956, shortly after her half-brother, actor Jeffrey Byron, was born to her mother. She was 17 when Tamblyn and she had their wedding in the Wayfarers Chapel in Palos Verdes. Stevenson and Tamblyn divorced in April 1957, but the two remained friends. A widely reproduced photograph shows Stevenson calmly walking down a Los Angeles street, seemingly unaware that Tamblyn is doing a spectacular backward aerial handspring a few inches away from her. 

Stevenson had a year-long affair with actor Audie Murphy, which began when they co-starred in Seven Ways from Sundown in 1960.

Stevenson remarried, to Don Everly, in 1962 and retired from acting and modelling. She had often complained about how much she hated acting. The couple had two daughters, Stacy and Erin Everly, both model/actresses, and a son, Edan Everly, a musician. She divorced Don Everly in 1970 and never remarried. Erin, the ex-wife of rocker Axl Rose, was the inspiration for several Guns N' Roses songs, including "Sweet Child o' Mine", where she also appeared in the video.

Friendships and publicity romances
Despite not having a starring role in a film before 1958, Stevenson was incredibly popular in fan magazines. She was labelled "the most photogenic girl in the world" and went in rounds of dates; however, most of the men she went out with were only friends to her.

In his 2005 autobiography, Tab Hunter Confidential: the Making of a Movie Star, Tab Hunter, with whom she frequently dated, admitted that she was a large part of his and his then-boyfriend, Anthony Perkins's, social life, "acting as a 'beard' when we double-dated." Although their relationship was an open secret in Hollywood, Stevenson acted as a confidant for Perkins during the course of their romance. "[C]ertainly, we all knew Tony [Perkins] was gay," Stevenson admitted to a Perkins biographer. "...We were real friends, and he would sleep over at my house in the same bed. But there was never, ever any... well, you know. If you have a friend of the opposite sex who's gay, it's just up in the air."

Death
Stevenson died on 26 September 2022, at a health care facility in Atlanta from Parkinson’s disease.

References

External links
 
 

1938 births
2022 deaths
Actresses from London
British expatriates in the United States
Deaths from Parkinson's disease 
English female models
English film actresses
English stage actresses
English television actresses
Neurological disease deaths in Georgia (U.S. state)
The Everly Brothers
Western (genre) film actresses
20th-century English actresses